J. Arnold Robert-Tissot (26 May 1846 – 20 October 1925) was a Swiss politician and President of the Swiss Council of States (1899/1900).

External links 
 
 

1846 births
1925 deaths
Members of the Council of States (Switzerland)
Presidents of the Council of States (Switzerland)